Mista Thug Isolation is the debut studio album by rapper Lil Ugly Mane. It was self-released via Bandcamp on February 11, 2012, with a vinyl release by Hundebiss Records. The album is entirely self-produced as Shawn Kemp, with guest appearances from Supa Sortahuman and Denzel Curry.

Background 
The album attracted attention in the underground hip hop scene for its Memphis rap-inspired sound and would bring Lil Ugly Mane to mainstream popularity after also previously appearing on SpaceGhostPurrp's debut mixtape Blackland Radio 66.6 in 2011. Members of hip hop collective Odd Future Tyler, the Creator and Earl Sweatshirt showed support for Lil Ugly Mane and the album, specifically the song "Throw Dem Gunz".
 
The songs "Radiation (Lung Pollution)", "Lookin 4 Tha Suckin", and "Twistin" were previously on Lil Ugly Mane's 2012 mixtape Criminal Hypnosis: Unreleased Shit. "Twistin" was also released previously on Denzel Curry's 2012 mixtape King of the Mischievous South, Vol. 1.

Critical reception 

In a retrospective review, Pitchfork's Andy O'Connor gave the album a positive review, stating: "A project such as Isolation has the potential to have 'tourist' written all over it, but the most surprising thing about Miller is that he has serious bars. While he traffics in the same boastfulness rife in hip-hop, he’s got a gift for absurdity with the strangest and catchiest lyricism."

Track listing 
All tracks are produced by Lil Ugly Mane, under his production alias Shawn Kemp.

References 

2012 debut albums
Travis Miller (musician) albums
Phonk